The Reserve Division of Yulin was a short-lived reserve infantry formation of China's People's Liberation Army active between 1984 and 1989.

The division was formally activated in July/August/September 5, 1984 in Yulin, Shaanxi. By then the division was then composed of:
1st Regiment
2nd Regiment
3rd Regiment - Hengshan
Artillery Regiment

In December 1989, the division was disbanded along with all its subordinates. Another source stated it was disbanded in 1985.

References

Reserve divisions of the People's Liberation Army
Military units and formations established in 1984